The 2013 FORU Oceania Cup for national rugby union teams in the Oceania region was held in Papua New Guinea at the Lloyd Robson Oval in Port Moresby from 6 to 13 July.

Fiji and the other Band 1 teams from Oceania teams (Australia, New Zealand, Samoa, and Tonga) do not participate in the Oceania Cup.

Standings

Matches

See also
 FORU Oceania Cup

Reference list

2013
2013 rugby union tournaments for national teams
2013 in Oceanian rugby union
International rugby union competitions hosted by Papua New Guinea